Harry Bakwin (November 19, 1894 – December 25, 1973) was a New York pediatrician, and also a Professor of Pediatrics at New York University.

Biography
Born in 1894 to a Jewish family, Bakwin graduated with a M.D. from Columbia University College of Physicians and Surgeons in 1917. In 1925, Bakwin married Ruth Morris Bakwin who was an heir to some of the fortunes made by the Chicago meat-packing industry as the daughter of Edward Morris, son of the founder of Morris & Company; and Helen Swift Morris, the daughter of Gustavus Swift, founder of Swift & Company.  Her sister was psychiatrist Muriel Gardiner who was married to the Austrian politician Joseph Buttinger.

He and his wife had four children: Edward Bakwin, Michael Bakwin, Barbara Bakwin Rosenthal, and Patricia Bakwin Selch.

Writing
As a pediatrician, Bakwin authored many articles relevant to children, often with his wife. The 1931 Journal of Clinical Investigation paper "Body Build in Infants" compared the external dimensions of sick infants with dimensions in healthy children. Together with his wife, he wrote the widely regarded medical text, Clinical Management of Behavior Disorders in Children. Bakwin and his wife co-authored an early piece on the speech disorder cluttering (also called tachyphemia) in 1952, years before cluttering was commonly discussed. Bakwin observed that clutterers could temporarily overcome their speech defect when they tried to do so.

The Bakwin Collection
Shortly after their marriage, Bakwin and his wife began procuring many famous paintings, known as the Bakwin Collection. Included in those paintings was Van Gogh's painting, Madame Ginoux, a version which the artist gave to his brother Theo.  The painting was held in the collection by son Edward M. Bakwin, until it was sold at auction on May 2, 2006 at Christie's, New York, for more than $40 million (USD). The Bakwins traveled to Europe every year with their four children, and bought art to display in their Manhattan town house. The Bakwin Collection included works by Van Gogh, Matisse, Cézanne, Gauguin, Modigliani, and Picasso.

References

1973 deaths
American art collectors
American pediatricians
American Jews
Physicians from New York City
1894 births
Columbia University Vagelos College of Physicians and Surgeons alumni
Morris family (meatpacking)